The Russian Singer is a 1993 Danish thriller film directed by Morten Arnfred and starring Ole Lemmeke. It was entered into the 43rd Berlin International Film Festival.

Cast
 Ole Lemmeke as Jack Andersen
 Elena Butenko as Lili
 Vsevolod Larionov as Colonel Gavrilin
 Igor Volkov as Basov Aleksandrovitj
 Igor Yasulovich as Pyotr Demichev
 Jesper Christensen as Castensen
 Erik Mørk as C.W.
 Andrei Yurenyov as Tushin (as Andrei Yurenev)
 Igor Statsenko as Dima
 Oleg Plaksin as General Panyukov
 Vladimir Troshin as General Vlasov
 Yuriy Sherstnyov as Panyukov's Lawyer
 Vladimir Grammatikov as Nikolaj Davidovitj Klejmann

References

External links

1993 films
1993 thriller films
1990s Danish-language films
Films directed by Morten Arnfred
Danish thriller films